Strahil Peak is the sharp rocky peak rising to 2700 m just west of the main crest of north-central Sentinel Range in Ellsworth Mountains, Antarctica.  It is named after the Bulgarian rebel leader Strahil Voyvoda (mid-17th century – c. 1711).

Location
US mapping in 1961 and 1988.

Maps
 Vinson Massif.  Scale 1:250 000 topographic map.  Reston, Virginia: US Geological Survey, 1988.
 Antarctic Digital Database (ADD). Scale 1:250000 topographic map of Antarctica. Scientific Committee on Antarctic Research (SCAR). Since 1993, regularly updated.

References
 Strahil Peak. SCAR Composite Gazetteer of Antarctica.
 Bulgarian Antarctic Gazetteer. Antarctic Place-names Commission. (details in Bulgarian, basic data in English)

External links
 Strahil Peak. Copernix satellite image

Ellsworth Mountains
Bulgaria and the Antarctic
Mountains of Ellsworth Land